Guy Sinon (1933 – 1992) was a Seychellois politician who served as Minister for Foreign Affairs from 1977 to 1979. He also served as Minister for Education and Minister for Administration and Political Affairs.

His sister Marie-Pierre Lloyd, wife Rita Sinon, and son Peter Sinon have also served in the Cabinet of Seychelles.

References

1933 births
1992 deaths
Education ministers of Seychelles
Foreign Ministers of Seychelles
Government ministers of Seychelles